Kowtar is a village located in Mokriyan-e Gharbi Rural District, in the Central District of Mahabad County, West Azerbaijan Province, Iran. At the time of the 2006 census, its population was 261, in 36 families.

References 

Populated places in Mahabad County